Quinn Redeker (May 2, 1936 – December 20, 2022) was an American actor and screenwriter, best known for his work on daytime dramas.

Life and career
Redeker and Lou Garfield co-authored the story for the 1978 film The Deer Hunter. Throughout 1960, Redeker was cast as a photographer on the short-lived NBC crime drama Dan Raven starring the former child actor Skip Homeier and Dan Barton. The following year, he appeared as nerdy Schulyer Davis in the film The Three Stooges Meet Hercules.

On television, he started acting in 1960 and amassed appearances on over five dozen television series. He is best known for his roles as Alex Marshall on Days of Our Lives, whom he played from 1979 to 1987, and on The Young and the Restless where he played Nick Reed in 1979, Joseph Taylor from 1979 to 1980, and his best-known character, Rex Sterling, from 1987 to 2004.

Redeker died on December 20, 2022, at the age of 86.

Awards
As a writer, Redeker was nominated for an Academy Award for Best Original Screenplay and a WGA Award for Best Drama Written Directly for the Screenplay for The Deer Hunter, along with Deric Washburn, Louis A. Garfinkle and Michael Cimino.

As an actor, Redeker was twice nominated for an Daytime Emmy Award for Outstanding Supporting Actor in a Drama Series for his role on The Young and the Restless, both in 1989 and 1990. He also was a two-time winner at the Soap Opera Digest Awards, taking the 1983 Soapy Award (last year they used that name) for Best Villain for his role on Days of our Lives, along with the 1989 award for "Outstanding Actor in a Supporting Role: Daytime" for The Young and the Restless.

Filmography

References

External links

 
 

1936 births
2022 deaths
American male screenwriters
American male soap opera actors
People from Woodstock, Illinois
Screenwriters from Illinois